Elizabeth Poirier (born October 27, 1942 in Boston, Massachusetts) is an American politician who represented the 14th Bristol district in the Massachusetts House of Representatives until 2021, and was the current Third Assistant House Minority Leader.  She succeeded her husband Kevin Poirier, who resigned to become director of development at Sturdy Memorial Hospital. She announced in March 2020 that she would not seek another term in that year's election.

See also
 2019–2020 Massachusetts legislature

References

1942 births
Johnson & Wales University alumni
Republican Party members of the Massachusetts House of Representatives
People from North Attleborough, Massachusetts
Living people
Women state legislators in Massachusetts
21st-century American politicians
21st-century American women politicians